Casselia is a small genus of flowering plants in the verbena family (Verbenaceae) first named in 1823. Plants in the genus Casselia are native to South America.

Species
, Kew's Plants of the World Online accepts seven species in the genus Casselia:

Casselia chamaedryfolia 
Casselia confertiflora 
Casselia glaziovii 
Casselia integrifolia 
Casselia rosularis 
Casselia serrata 
Casselia zelota

References

Verbenaceae
Verbenaceae genera